The 1991 UCLA Bruins football team represented the University of California, Los Angeles in the 1991 NCAA Division I-A football season. The Bruins offense scored 323 points while the defense allowed 190 points.  The team finished with a 9–3 overall record, and tied for second place in the Pacific-10 Conference with a 6–2 record.  Led by head coach Terry Donahue, the Bruins competed in the John Hancock Bowl, now known as the Sun Bowl.

Schedule

Roster

Rankings

Game summaries

BYU

at Tennessee

vs. Illinois (John Hancock Bowl)

Awards and honors
 All-Americans: Matt Darby (S), Sean LaChapelle (WR, second team), Carlton Gray (CB, third team)
 All-Conference First Team: Matt Darby (S), Sean LaChapelle (WR), Vaughn Parker (OT)

1991 team players in the NFL
The following players were claimed in the 1992 NFL Draft.

References

UCLA
UCLA Bruins football seasons
Sun Bowl champion seasons
UCLA Bruins football